The Ullyot Public Affairs Lecture is an annual public lecture which focuses on contributions of the sciences (in particular chemistry and biology) to the public welfare.
The lecture is presented jointly by the Science History Institute, the American Chemical Society (ACS), the University of Pennsylvania, and the University of the Sciences.
The lecture was endowed in 1990 by Glenn Edgar Ullyot, a research chemist at Smith, Kline & French, and his wife Barbara Hodsdon Ullyot. Since 1997, the lecture has  been presented at the Science History Institute (formerly the Chemical Heritage Foundation) in Philadelphia, Pennsylvania.

Recipients 

The award is given yearly and was first presented in 1990.

See also

 List of chemistry awards

References

Chemistry awards